Caeser P. Chisolm was a state legislator. He represented Colleton County, South Carolina in the South Carolina House of Representatives.

He provided testimony as a witness to injuries causing disability to U.S. Colored Troops veteran James Perkins.

Chisolm received a charter to operate ferry service across the Ashepoo River.

He served in the 55th General Assembly in 1882 and 1883. Two of his children, Tom.and Silvia, gave accounts to the Slave Narrative Project.

See also
African-American officeholders during and following the Reconstruction era

References

Year of birth missing
People from Colleton County, South Carolina
Members of the South Carolina House of Representatives
Year of death missing
African-American state legislators in South Carolina
African-American politicians during the Reconstruction Era